Saint-Rémy-lès-Chevreuse is a railway station in Saint-Rémy-lès-Chevreuse, Paris, Île-de-France, France.

The station
The station opened on 26 August 1867 and is on the Ligne de Sceaux and has been an RER station since 9 December 1977. The station is served by RER Line B services operated by RATP.

Train services
The following services currently call at Aéroport Charles de Gaulle 1:

Réseau Express Régional stations
Railway stations in Yvelines
Railway stations in France opened in 1867